Bangweulu Solar Power Station (BSPS), is a  solar power plant in Zambia. The solar farm that was commercially commissioned in March 2019, was developed and is owned by a consortium comprising Neoen, a French IPP, Industrial Development Corporation of Zambia (IDC Zambia), a government parastatal company and First Solar, a US-based solar panel manufacturer. The power station cost US$60 million to develop.

Location
The geographical coordinates of Bangweulu Solar Power Station are 15°30'42.0"S, 28°25'54.0"E (Latitude:-15.511667; Longitude:28.431667), just north of the Ngonye Solar Power Station.

Overview
The Government of Zambia, through IDC Zambia, working with the World Bank Group, as part of the bank's program "Scaling Solar",  awarded the tender to develop this power station to Neoen, a French independent power producer. The American solar panel manufacturer First Solar Inc. was selected to manufacture and supply the solar panels for the power station.

The power generated here is purchased by  Zambia Electricity Supply Corporation Limited (ZESCO) under a 25-year power purchase agreement executed between ZESCO and Neoen at US$0.0602 per kWh.

Ownership
This power station is owned by a consortium whose members are illustrated in the table below. The members of the consortium formed a special purpose vehicle company Bangweulu Power Company Limited, which operates and maintains the power station.

Funding, construction and timeline
This renewable energy infrastructure development project received a grant of US$2 million, from the United States Agency for International Development (USAID).

The International Finance Corporation (IFC), and the Overseas Private Investment Corporation (formerly OPIC, now DFC), jointly lent US$39 million to the consortium of owner/developers of BSPS.

The EPC contract was awarded to Sterling & Wilson, an engineering and Construction company, based in India. Construction started in December 2017, with commercial commissioning taking place in March 2019.

See also

List of power stations in Zambia
Ngonye Solar Power Station

References

External links
 Scaling Solar: The Complete Package

Power stations in Zambia
Kafue District
Lusaka Province
Solar power stations in Zambia
2019 establishments in Zambia
Energy infrastructure completed in 2019